is a side-scrolling platform game published by Konami based on the manga and anime franchise Mighty Atom (Astro Boy in English) by Osamu Tezuka. The game was released exclusively in Japan for the Famicom on February 26, 1988.

Gameplay
The game consists of a total of ten stages, which the player must traverse in a side scrolling, platforming fashion, while figuring out riddles along the way. The game's objective is to recover the money that was stolen from Professor Ochanomizu's lab. Instead of the usual extra lives, Atom's remaining life energy is determined by the amount of uranium (abbreviated "uran" in the game) he has left in his disposal. Atom begins each stage with 300 uran points, that will gradually decrease with each second. Every time Atom gets hit by certain enemies, falls from a pitfall, or runs out of time, the professor will use his remaining uran points to rebuild Atom. The player can also summon the professor during gameplay to replenish their uran points. The game ends if both, Atom and the professor, use up all of their uran points.

Atom's actions consists of a standard jump and punch attack, as well as the ability to fly through the air for a limited period. To fly, the player must hold down the directional pad left or right while jumping three times in a row. The player can also collect coins by finding them in hidden places or hitting certain enemies, allowing the player to buy some extra items, including more uranium in case the player gets a Game Over, allowing them to continue. There are some hidden souvenirs throughout the game as well, which reward extra points if brought to the end of the stage they are found in.

References

External links
Mighty Atom at GameFAQs

1988 video games
Konami
Konami games
Magical Company games
Platform games
Side-scrolling video games
Nintendo Entertainment System games
Nintendo Entertainment System-only games
Superhero video games
Japan-exclusive video games
Video games based on anime and manga
Video games developed in Japan

ja:鉄腕アトム#ゲーム